Top of the Form may refer to:

 Top of the Form (quiz show), a BBC radio and television quiz show for secondary school students 1948 to 1986 
 Top of the Form (film), a 1953 British comedy starring Ronald Shiner